Dübendorf is a railway station in the Swiss canton of Zurich. It is situated in the municipality of Dübendorf on the Wallisellen–Uster–Rapperswil line.

Service 
Dübendorf station is served by Zürich S-Bahn lines S9 and S14. During weekends, there is also a nighttime S-Bahn service (SN9) offered by ZVV. Rail services are as follows:

 Zürich S-Bahn:
 Nighttime S-Bahn (only during weekends):

References

External links 

 

Railway stations in the canton of Zürich
Swiss Federal Railways stations
Dübendorf